Joseph Patrick Neenan (born 17 March 1959) is an English former professional footballer who made nearly 400 appearances in the Football League playing as a goalkeeper for York City, Scunthorpe United, Burnley, Peterborough United and Scarborough.

References
General

Specific

1959 births
Living people
Footballers from Manchester
English footballers
Association football goalkeepers
York City F.C. players
Scunthorpe United F.C. players
Burnley F.C. players
Peterborough United F.C. players
Scarborough F.C. players
English Football League players